Tủa Chùa is a commune-level town (thị trấn) and principal town of Tủa Chùa District of Điện Biên Province, northwestern Vietnam.

References

Townships in Vietnam
Populated places in Điện Biên province
District capitals in Vietnam